Lake Hüüdre (Estonian: Hüüdre järv, also Hüüdra järv) is a lake located in the Otepää Uplands in Jõgehara village, Kanepi Parish, Põlva County, Estonia.

Lake Hüüdre is an elongated lake in the east-west direction. The lake is 590 meters long, 125 meters wide, and has an area of 5.3 hectares. It is located in a forested area in a gentle depression. The shores on the north side of the lake are steep and gravelly. On the west side of which begins a small swampy area. On the southwest side there is a corner community of seven houses. Forestry roads run on different sides of the lake, but none of them go all the way to the shore. The shores of the lake are sandy. The lake is considered part of the Pühajõgi drainage basin.

According to the classification of the Water Framework Directive, in terms of water hardness, the lake is a soft-water lake with a pale water color. The lake is classified limnologically as both a soft water and a mixotrophic lake. The lime content of the water is low, but at the same time its nutrient content and humus composition are high. 

There are about 16 species of aquatic plants in the lake. In 1972, there were more abundant water plants, for example Acorus calamus, Carex, Phragmites australis, Calla, Typha, Menyanthes, and the non-native Elodea canadensis. Among the floating plants, there was more abundant Nuphar and Sparganium gramineum.

Several fish species are found in the lake, including sunbleak, Crucian carp, and European perch.

References

See also
List of lakes of Estonia

Huudre
Kanepi Parish
Huudre